Elizabeth Balfour may refer to:

Elizabeth Balfour, Countess of Balfour (1867–1942), English politician, suffragette, and peeress
Betty Balfour (1903–1977), English actress